Gliophorus versicolor is a species of agaric fungus in the family Hygrophoraceae. Found in New Zealand, it was described as new to science in 1973 by mycologist Egon Horak. Within the genus Gliophorus, it is classified in the section Glutinosae, a grouping of species characterized by having bright colors, decurrent gills, and a gelatinized subhymenium. Moist caps are gluey with a color ranging from reddish brown to pinkish-lilac; the cap margin has radial grooves mirroring the gills underneath. The gills have an adnate to somewhat decurrent attachment to the stipe. They are widely spaced with color similar to the cap, or whitish. The fungus is saprobic, and fruits on the ground among Dacrycarpus and Nothofagus.

References

External links

Hygrophoraceae
Fungi described in 1973
Fungi of New Zealand
Taxa named by Egon Horak